A list of films released in Japan in 1970 (see 1970 in film).

See also
1970 in Japan
1970 in Japanese television

References

Footnotes

Sources

External links
Japanese films of 1970 at the Internet Movie Database

1970
Japanese
Films